Kangundo Constituency is an electoral constituency in Kenya. It is one of eight constituencies in Machakos County. The constituency has six wards, all electing councillors for the Kangundo town council.

The constituency was established for the 1969 elections.

Members of Parliament

Locations and wards

References

External links 
Map of the constituency

Constituencies in Eastern Province (Kenya)
Constituencies in Machakos County
1969 establishments in Kenya
Constituencies established in 1969